Samarasinghe may refer to

G.V.P. Samarasinghe, Sri Lankan civil servant
H. H. R. Samarasinghe, Sri Lankan Physician
Mahinda Samarasinghe,  Sri Lankan politician
Mendaka Samarasinghe, Sri Lankan Army officer
Thisara Samarasinghe, Sri Lankan navy officer
T. M. Samarasinghe, Sri Lankan cricket umpire.
Sandith Samarasinghe, Sri Lankan politician

Sinhalese surnames